Austroptyctodus gardineri is a small ptyctodontid placoderm fish from the Upper Devonian Gogo Formation of Western Australia.  First described by Miles & Young (1977) as a new species of the German genus Ctenurella. Long (1997) redescribed the German material and found major differences in the skull roof pattern so assigned it to a new genus, Austroptyctodus. This genus lacks spinal plates and has Ptyctodus-like toothplates.

The most significant discovery about Austroptyctodus is that one specimen depicts a female pregnant with 3 unborn embryos inside her, showing that like Materpiscis, also from Gogo, this genus was a live bearer that reproduced through internal fertilization.

Feeding habits 
Austroptyctodus fossil individuals have ostracods recovered in the abdominal region. These ostracods were related to nocturnal ones, suggesting it hunted at night.

References

Placoderms of Australia
Placoderm genera
Gogo fauna
Ptyctodontids
Fossil taxa described in 1997